Room and board is a phrase describing a situation in which, in exchange for money, labor or other considerations, a person is provided with a place to live as well as meals on a comprehensive basis. It commonly occurs as a fee at higher educational institutions, such as colleges and universities; it also occurs in hotel-style accommodation for short stays.

Definition
Room refers to a private bedroom provided, sometimes with a private ensuite bathroom.
Board may refer to the food being provided, or alternatively, the table on which food is served.

With a room and board arrangement, the renter has a private bedroom and shares the rest of the house with the person renting out the room. This is different from renting where the renter has private living areas, including a bedroom, bathroom and kitchen.

Two commonly encountered boards are:
 Half Board, where the host provides only a breakfast and dinner meals.
 Full Board, where the host provides all three daily meals.

Another option is:
 Bed and breakfast, literally, a place to sleep and where breakfast is provided.

See also

Bistro, a type of informal French restaurant
Boarding house, a lodging establishment
Boarding school
Parlour boarder, an archaic term for a category of pupil at boarding school
Sideboard, an article of furniture from which food is served in a dining room

References
 http://www.phrases.org.uk/bulletin_board/15/messages/521.html
 http://www.funtrivia.com/askft/Question30318.html
 http://www.snopes.com/language/phrases/1500.htm

External link

Hotel terminology
Food and drink terminology